The Korg Minilogue is a two VCO per-voice, four-voice, polyphonic analog synthesizer from Korg, designed by Korg engineer and synthesizer designer Tatsuya Takahashi. It was announced just prior to NAMM 2016, and is priced new at $499.99 in the United States, ¥55,000 in Japan and £449 in the United Kingdom and Europe. Its official release was preceded by leaks which caused media speculation.

Voice modes
The Minilogue features eight distinct voice-modes:

 POLY – operates as a four-voice polyphonic synthesizer
 DUO – operates as a unison two-voice polyphonic synthesizer
 UNISON – operates as an all-unison mono synthesizer
 MONO – operates as a mono synth with sub-oscillators
 CHORD – produces chords
 DELAY – voices 2–4 sound consecutively at a delay following voice 1
 ARP – an arpeggiator operates with up to four voices
 SIDE CHAIN – when a note sounds, the volume of the preceding voice is lowered

Notable users
 Jimmy Edgar
 Richard Devine
 Misha Mansoor
 Charly Bliss
 Lætitia Sadier
 haZy ben

See also
Korg Monologue

References

External links
 Korg Minilogue on Korg's official site
 Complete standalone and VST editor
 9 Ways to Get More Out of Your Korg Minilogue on MusicRadar

Korg synthesizers
Polyphonic synthesizers
Analog synthesizers